Parliamentary elections were held in Ivory Coast on 26 November 1995. Ten parties and a number of independents contested the election, with the Rally of the Republicans and the Ivorian Popular Front running under the Republican Front banner. The result was a victory for the ruling Democratic Party of Ivory Coast – African Democratic Rally (PDCI-RDA), which won 148 of the 175 seats. 

The results in seven constituencies were annulled following the election, and reruns held on 27 December. As a result, the PDCI-RDA increased its number of seats to 150, whilst the opposition were reduced to 25.

Results

References

Ivory Coast
1995 in Ivory Coast
Elections in Ivory Coast
November 1995 events in Africa
Election and referendum articles with incomplete results